The Embassy of France in Washington, D.C., is the French diplomatic mission to the United States.

It is located at 4101 Reservoir Road, Northwest, Washington, D.C., just north of Georgetown University. The embassy opened in 1984. With some 400 staffers, it is France's largest foreign embassy. The embassy represents the interests of France and French citizens in the United States and conducts the majority of diplomatic work on such interests within the U.S.

In September 2021, Ambassador Philippe Étienne was recalled to France.  The measure was unprecedented; in almost 250 years of diplomatic relations, France had never before recalled its US ambassadorship. The Biden administration tried to placate French anger.

Structure
The embassy is headed by the French Ambassador to the United States, currently Philippe Étienne. In addition to the standard diplomatic facilities, the compound includes La Maison Française, a cultural facility consisting of an auditorium, ballroom, and exhibition hall. Like many embassies, it regularly hosts events for the general public including concerts (e.g. baroque, classical, jazz, contemporary, pop and alternative music), films, dance, exhibitions, lectures and theatre.

Services
The embassy operates several services and offices, responsible for different areas of policy and for liaising with relevant American bodies. The most notable of the services are listed below.

Chancery
The Chancery is the main diplomatic and political body. It is responsible for coordination with the American government on matters that affect France, particularly foreign policy. However, diplomacy is primarily conducted by the ambassador, leaving the chancery to liaise with the French government and coordinate with the Press Service in matters of public policy. The diplomats of the chancery take responsibility for a specific policy area and may stand in for the ambassador in his absence.
The Chancery has attachés based in each of the ten regional consulates.

Press and Communications Office
The Press Service is responsible for the publication of the embassy's newsletter and magazine, as well as coordinating press releases and conferences, including the provision of designated spokesmen. The office also monitors American press coverage on issues pertaining to France and reports back to the ambassador and to Paris.

The Offices of the Defence and Armament Attachés
These offices promote cooperation between the two countries on military and defense matters. The primary responsibility of the former is to facilitate liaison between the two government departments and the two nations' militaries, while latter oversees cooperation on matters of armaments and has responsibility for arms spending in the US as well as working with the US to develop new military technology. Both offices have a role to play in keeping the ambassador abreast of current defence issues and advising the Pentagon on French defence policy.

The Cultural Service
The Cultural Services of the embassy is located at 972 Fifth Avenue in Manhattan, New York City. Its responsibility is to facilitate "cultural exchange" between the two nations, a role that can be creative, informative or merely administrative. The duties of the service include promoting French creative works in cultural and academic institutions from across France, with the help of the attachés in regional consulates.

The Office of Science and Technology 
The Office of Science and Technology (OS&T) is tasked with: 
 promoting French science and technology with US actors, and with science expats, by organizing events and publishing local or topical newsletters;
 outreach activities to US academia and federal research bodies, with other European science advisors, and through an active presence in the Science Diplomats Club through "Science Breakfasts" organized since 2005, chairing the Club since 2010;
 watching and reporting on scientific breakthroughs, investments and innovations in key fields, by networking with academia, R&D agencies, non-governmental organizations, Congress, think tanks, etc.;
 building and sustaining scientific partnerships by organizing expert visits, seminars, and promoting annual calls of the French-US joint endowments and funds;
 fostering doctoral mobility of students and researchers, in particular with its flagship Chateaubriand program (see below).

OS&T is an active, reactive and proactive observer of scientific activity, technological innovations and their impact on the US society and beyond. OS&T is headquartered at the Washington, D.C. embassy and has teams at the French consulates of Atlanta, Boston, Chicago, Houston, Los Angeles, and San Francisco. OS&T collaborates with French research agencies, universities, engineering schools, and competitiveness clusters.

Chateaubriand Program
The Chateaubriand Fellowship Program, run by the Embassy of France, offers scholarships for US students to study in France.  Founded in 1981, the fellowship  has provided semester- and year-long support to over 750 students in the humanities, social sciences, natural sciences, and technology. The acceptance rate for the fellowship is between 6 and 8 percent annually.

The program, which aims to promote French-US cooperation, is run by the Office for Science & Technology and the Cultural Services division.

The Office for Economic and Commercial Affairs
This is the office primarily concerned with maintaining and developing new trade links between the countries. For example, it assists French businesses trying to establish themselves in the US and vice versa. It also helps large and small French businesses which have long since established themselves in the American market, providing support and advice on economic and trade policies, both within the US and in France.

The French Treasury Office
This office represents the French Treasury in the United States and Canada. It works in close partnership with the Federal Reserve, the Department of the Treasury and French and American financial institutions. Its role is to develop French economic policy in conjunction with the aforementioned bodies and to explain the policies to the United States. It has two offices, one in the embassy and a second in New York, from where it can work with Wall Street in order to better develop monetary policy.

Controversy 
In 2006, an employee of the Cultural Service of the French Embassy was fired for the motive of being pregnant and Muslim, a judge ruled.  "This may be the only time a U.S. court has extended the reach of the civil rights laws to extend to a foreign citizen, working for a foreign government on foreign soil at an embassy here in D.C." said Ari Wilkenfeld for NBC Washington.

Ambassador's residence

The French ambassador's residence at 2221 Kalorama Road NW is a 1910 Tudor Revival building in Washington's Kalorama neighborhood.  Designed by the French-born American architect Jules Henri de Sibour for businessman William Watson Lawrence, the home was purchased by the French government in 1936. In February 2015, the home reopened after undergoing a $4.5 million renovation. The home features art, mostly by French artists such as Pierre Bonnard, but also by non-French artists such as Igor Mitoraj. The property at one point encompassed 3.6 acres, but in 2017 the French government put an empty tract of 0.58 acres of the property up for sale.

Consulates
The ambassador is also ultimately responsible for the 10 regional consulates:
Consulate General of France in Atlanta, responsible for Alabama, North Carolina, South Carolina, Georgia, Mississippi, and Tennessee
Consulate General of France in Boston, responsible for Massachusetts, Maine, New Hampshire, Rhode Island, and Vermont
Consulate General of France in Chicago responsible for Illinois, Indiana, Iowa, Kansas, Kentucky, Michigan, Minnesota, Missouri, Nebraska, North Dakota, South Dakota, Ohio, Wisconsin.
Consulate General of France in Houston, responsible for Texas, Oklahoma and Arkansas
Consulate General of France in Los Angeles, responsible for Arizona, Colorado, New Mexico, Southern California, and Southern Nevada
Consulate General of France in Miami, responsible for Florida,  Puerto Rico, the Bahamas, the U.S. Virgin Islands, Cayman Islands, and Turks and Caicos Islands
Consulate General of France in New Orleans, responsible for Louisiana
Consulate General of France in New York, responsible for New York, New Jersey, Connecticut, and Bermuda
Consulate General of France in San Francisco, responsible for Northern California, Northern Nevada, Alaska, Hawaii, Idaho, Montana, Oregon, Utah, Washington, Wyoming, and Guam.
Consulate General of France in Washington, responsible for the District of Columbia and states of Maryland, Virginia, West Virginia, Delaware and Pennsylvania.

See also
 List of diplomatic missions of France
 Alliance française
 France – United States relations

References

External links

  

France
Washington, D.C.
Georgetown (Washington, D.C.)
France–United States relations
Government buildings completed in 1984
1980s architecture in the United States